This is a list of Registered Buildings and Conservation Areas of the Isle of Man. It includes buildings and structures in the Isle of Man designated by Isle of Man's Department of Environment, Food and Agriculture (DEFA) "as having special architectural or historical interest". Over 250 buildings and structures are listed, and 275 more have been identified as having potential for listing.  It also lists the 21 Conservation Areas, historic districts" which protect "period"-type architecture, quality of building materials, relationships of enclosures and open spaces, and other aspects of the look and feel of historic buildings and areas.

Ongoing enforcement and registration of buildings is administered by a Planning and Building Control Directorate, within DEFA, and is guided by a planning policy document on conservation of the historic environment.
 
DEFA notes that eight of the registered buildings have thatched roofs. Thatching in the Isle of Man include a group of thatched houses at Cregneash Folk Museum, which are Manx National Heritage property, whose buildings and land are excluded from the register.

DEFA notes that ten are designed by noted architect Baillie Scott.  A number are designed by, or associated with, architect Thomas Brine.

The Alliance for Building Conservation, a consortium of heritage groups on the Isle of Man, was organised in 2014–15 and has advocated for more preservation of buildings.  It had concerns in 2015 about a backlog for registration of heritage buildings.

The 21 Conservation Areas include nine swaths of properties in the capital town of Douglas, and swaths in towns of Peel, Castletown, and Ramsey, and sections in nine village centers or other areas.  Most of these include numerous individual Registered Buildings plus all surrounding properties.

Registered Buildings

The Registered Buildings are as follows:

KEY

Conservation Areas

See also
List of churches on the Isle of Man
Windmills in the Isle of Man

Notes

References

Protected areas of the Isle of Man
 
 
Lists of buildings and structures in the Isle of Man
Thatched buildings in the Isle of Man
Monuments and memorials in the Isle of Man